The Dudley-Williams Baronetcy, of the city and of the county of the city of Exeter, is a title in the Baronetage of the United Kingdom. It was created on 2 July 1964 for the aeronautical engineer and Conservative politician, Sir Rolf Dudley-Williams. On receiving the baronetcy, on 29 June 1964 Williams changed his surname to Dudley-Williams by deed poll. As of 2010 the title is held by his son, the second Baronet, who succeeded in 1987.

Journalist Marina Hyde is the daughter of the second Baronet.

Dudley-Williams baronets, of Exeter (1964)
Sir Rolf Dudley Dudley-Williams, 1st Baronet (1908–1987)
Sir Alastair Edgcumbe James Dudley-Williams, 2nd Baronet (born 1943)

The heir presumptive is the present holder's brother Malcolm Dudley-Williams.

References

Kidd, Charles, Williamson, David (editors). Debrett's Peerage and Baronetage (1990 edition). New York: St Martin's Press, 1990.

Baronetcies in the Baronetage of the United Kingdom